Barbara Korun (born 1963) is a Slovene poet. She is one of the leading figures in the generation of radical young women poets in Slovenia and her poems have also been translated into English and published in the USA and Ireland (translated by Theo Dorgan).

Korun was born in Ljubljana in 1963. She studied Slovene language and Comparative literature at the University of Ljubljana and worked as a lecturer and dramaturge. Her poems have been published in literary journals and anthologies both at home and abroad and she regularly appears at literary festivals and poetry readings. 

In 2011 she received the Veronika Award for her poetry collection Pridem takoj.

Poetry collections

 Ostrina miline (The Edge of Grace), 1999
 Zapiski iz podmizja (Notes from under the Table), 2003
 Razpoke (Fissures), 2004
 Pridem takoj (Back soon), 2011
 Čećica, motenja od ljubezni, 2014
 Vmes, 2016
 Idioritmija, 2021

References

Slovenian women poets
Slovenian poets
Living people
1963 births
Writers from Ljubljana
Veronika Award laureates
University of Ljubljana alumni